Augustin Simion Petrechei (born 4 August 1980 in Constanța) is a Romanian rugby union player. He plays as a lock.

Petrechei has been playing in France for USA Perpignan (2004/05), AS Béziers Hérault (2005/06-2008/09), US Marmande (2009/10) and for CA Périgueux, since 2010/11.

Petrechei had 21 caps for Romania, from 2002 to 2009, scoring 2 tries, 10 points on aggregate. Petrechei first game was at 7 September 2002, in a 39-8 loss to Ireland, in Limerick, in a friendly match. He was called for the 2003 Rugby World Cup, playing in three games and scoring a try. He would be called once again to the 2007 Rugby World Cup, but he never played. His most recent game was at 28 November 2009, in the 28-19 loss to Fiji, in Bucharest, in a tour friendly.

References

External links

1980 births
Living people
Romanian rugby union players
Rugby union locks
Romania international rugby union players
Romanian expatriate rugby union players
Expatriate rugby union players in France
Romanian expatriate sportspeople in France
Sportspeople from Constanța
AS Béziers Hérault players
CA Périgueux players
USA Perpignan players